Adams Seamount (also known as Forty Mile Reef) is a submarine volcano above the Pitcairn hotspot in the central Pacific Ocean about  southwest of Pitcairn Island.

Geography and geomorphology 

Adams lies southeast of another large seamount, Bounty Seamount. They were discovered in 1989 by the RV Sonne research ship.

Adams has two summits, and coral and sand derived from coral has been found on Adams. Given its height, during the last glacial maximum Adams was likely an island.

Its slopes are covered by recent lava flows, volcanic debris and hyaloclastite. Lava flows feature aa lava characteristics and lava tubes, while deeper parts of the edifice are covered with lapilli and scoria. Parasitic vents form cones and mounds on its flanks.

Geology 

Adams and the other seamounts were created by the Pitcairn hotspot, and these seamounts are its present-day location. This hotspot is one among several hotspots in the Pacific Ocean, along with the Austral hotspot, Hawaii hotspot, Louisville hotspot, Samoa hotspot and Society hotspot. The seamounts rise from a 30 million years old crust.

Alkali basalt, trachyte and tholeiite have been dredged from Adams Seamount.

Eruption history 

The fresh appearance of samples and the lack of sedimentation indicates that Adams Seamount is a recently active seamount. Potassium-argon dating of rocks dredged from Adams Seamount has yielded Holocene ages, including one age of 3,000 ± 1,000 years before present. Other ages range from 4,000 - 7,000 years before present. Unlike Bounty, Adams Seamount displays no active hydrothermal system.

Biology 

Adams seamount features a coral reef, one of the deepest tropical reefs in the world. It is mainly formed by Pocillopora sp. and Porites deformis corals, but also many reef fish and sharks; it is used as a fishing ground by Pitcairn. Adams seamount is part of the Pitcairn Islands Marine Reserve.

References

Sources 

 
 
 
 
 

Submarine volcanoes
Hotspot volcanoes
Seamounts of the Pacific Ocean
Landforms of the Pitcairn Islands
Former islands from the last glacial maximum